Hentsch is the name of a bank in Geneva, Switzerland.

The bank is joint to one of two of the most long-standingly existing banks within Switzerland, (after Wegelin & Co of 1741), the other being Lombard Odier (of Geneva).

History of the bank
The Hy Hentsch & Co. bank was founded in 1796 by Henri Hentsch (1761–1835). During 1835, the bank was renamed Hentsch & Cie, became Darier, Hentsch & Cie sometime during 1991, during 1994 the bank was part of Odier Bungener bank, and Lombard Odier Darier Hentsch & Cie since 2002.

Biography of founding member
 
Henri Hermann François Gottlob Hentsch was born on 17 February 1761 in Geneva, to Benjamin-Gottlob, a pastor, and Marie-Charlotte Delaporte, and died on 14 August 1835, in Neuilly-sur-Seine (Ile-de-France). He belonged to a family originating from Tzschecheln (Lower Lusatia), the family having emigrated to Switzerland during the 18th century; Benjamin Gottlob, settled in Geneva during 1758.

During 1785 Henri married Louise Cardoini, and naturalized to Geneva during 1792, becoming a bourgeois of Netstal.

Henri was apprenticed to Develay & Cie, this concluded with employment with Picot, Fazy & Cie engaged in manufacturing of assorted fabrics, money-changing and banking, whose business branched to Lyon during 1787, proceeding to open a bureau de change in Geneva. He was imprisoned and subsequently exiled (c. 1793) in the révolution de genevoise. Henri continued in Nyon with a commercial enterprise involving drapery, returning to Geneva to found H. Hentsch & Cie, silks and commissions. During 1798 he went into association with his cousin Jean-Gédéon Lombard, forming Hentsch, Lombard & Cie, (commissions). Henri during 1815 to 1827, was part of the membership of the Conseil de genevois.

See also
Bénédict Hentsch & Cie
Senarclens

Sources

External links
 Henri Hentsch Asset Management

Banks established in 1796
1796 establishments in Europe
18th-century establishments in Switzerland